Can You Dig It? may refer to:

 "Can You Dig It?", a 1968 song from the Monkees album Head
 "Can You Dig It" (song), a 1991 song by the Mock Turtles
 Can You Dig It? (album), a 2009 compilation album of music from Blaxploitation films